Phlomis is a genus of over 100 species of herbaceous plants, subshrubs and shrubs in the family Lamiaceae, native from the Mediterranean region east across central Asia to China.

The name Phlomis derives from a Greek word for "flame", and may refer to the leaves' use in ancient times as lamp wicks. Common names include Jerusalem sage and lampwick plant.

Description 
The overall size varies between species from 30 cm tall up to 2 m tall (12-79 in). The leaves are entire, opposite and decussate (each leaf pair at right angles to the next) and rugose or reticulate veined. The bracts (floral leaves) are similar or different from the lower leaves. All parts are frequently covered with hairs. The bracteoles are ovate, lanceolate or linear. The flowers are arranged in whorls called verticillasters which encircle the stems. The stems are usually square in section with rounded corners, although tomentum on the stems can make them appear circular. The colour of the flowers varies from yellow to pink, purple and white. The calyx is tubular or campanulate with five or ten veins visible. Five teeth, either all equal or with the outer two longer than the others. The upper lip is hood shaped and laterally compressed (P. tuberosa, however, has an uncompressed lip with a dense bearded edge). The lower lip is trifid, the central lobe being larger than the lateral ones. There are four stamens ascending under the upper lip. Anther with forked end, the upper fork being shorter than the lower. The fruits are four three-sided nutlets, and sometimes topped with hair, sometimes glabrous. The root system can be very extensive; roots of 6-week-old seedlings have been measured at 0.7 m.

Phlomis species are the only host plants of the moths Coleophora phlomidella and C. phlomidis.

Systematics 
The following species belong to genus Phlomis, but some of them are now distributed in the genus Phlomoides.

Phlomis 

 Phlomis armeniaca
 Phlomis bourgaei
 Phlomis bovei
 Phlomis cashmeriana
 Phlomis chrysophylla
 Phlomis crinita
 Phlomis fruticosa - Jerusalem sage
 Phlomis grandiflora
 Phlomis herba-venti
 Phlomis inaequalisepala
 Phlomis italica
 Phlomis lanata
 Phlomis longifolia
 Phlomis lychnitis - lampwick plant
 Phlomis lycia
 Phlomis purpurea
 Phlomis rigida
 Phlomis russeliana
 Phlomis samia
 Phlomis tathamiorum from Lebanon
 Phlomis viscosa

Phlomoides 

 Phlomis alpina now called Phlomoides alpina
 Phlomis betonicoides now called Phlomoides betonicoides
 Phlomis bracteosa now called Phlomoides bracteosa
 Phlomis macrophylla now called Phlomoides macrophylla
 Phlomis maximowiczii now called Phlomoides maximowiczii
 Phlomis melanantha now called Phlomoides melanantha
 Phlomis milingensis now called Phlomoides milingensis
 Phlomis oreophila now called Phlomoides oreophila
 Phlomis pratensis now called Phlomoides pratensis
 Phlomis rotata now called Phlomoides rotata
 Phlomis spectabilis now called Phlomoides spectabilis
 Phlomis tuberosa now called Phlomoides tuberosa
 Phlomis umbrosa now called Phlomoides umbrosa 
 Phlomis younghusbandii now called Phlomoides younghusbandii

References

External links
 

 
Lamiaceae genera
Taxa named by Carl Linnaeus